Jon-Talen Maples (born November 20, 1998) is an American professional soccer player who plays as a defender for Houston Dynamo 2.

College 
In 2017, he attended Southern Methodist University, playing for the Mustangs soccer team. He scored his first goal on September 15 against Loyola. In his freshman season, he was named to the American Athletic Conference All-Rookie Team. In 2018, he was named an AAC First Team All-Conference and Third Team All Region, and to the AAC All-Academic Team in 2018 and 2019. He missed most of the 2019 season due to a torn ACL and meniscus injury as well as the 2020 season, which was cancelled due to the COVID-19 pandemic.

Club career 
In 2018, he played for Premier Development League club Brazos Valley Cavalry.

He was drafted 72nd overall by Toronto FC in the 2021 MLS SuperDraft. He signed with their second team, Toronto FC II of USL League One, on May 5, 2021. He made his debut for Toronto FC II on May 22, 2021 against North Texas SC. He scored his first goal on October 1 against North Carolina FC. He attended the first team's 2022 training camp.

In February 2022, he signed with MLS Next Pro club Houston Dynamo 2. Serving as team captain, he helped Dynamo 2 to record ten clean sheets and finish the season tied for the least amount of goals conceded in the league and was named to the MLS Next Pro Best XI at the end of the season.

Career statistics

Honors
Individual
MLS Next Pro Best XI: 2022

References

1998 births
Association football defenders
American soccer players
Living people
SMU Mustangs men's soccer players
Toronto FC draft picks
USL League Two players
Brazos Valley Cavalry FC players
Soccer players from Texas
Toronto FC II players
MLS Next Pro players
USL League One players